Synchronized swimming competition has been in the Universiade only at 2013 as optional sport.

Events

Medal table

References 
Féderátion Internationale de Natation 

 
Universiade
Sports at the Summer Universiade